Knicks (Remix) is the fourth EP by hip hop duo MadGibbs, which consists of Indiana rapper Freddie Gibbs and California hip hop musician Madlib. Preceded by their 2014 album, Piñata, it was released on October 20, 2014 through Madlib Invazion in both digital and 12-inch vinyl formats.  The 6-track EP includes two vocal tracks, "Knicks (Remix)" featuring Action Bronson, Joey Badass and Ransom, and "Home" featuring singer BJ the Chicago Kid, as well as instrumentals and two bonus beats by Madlib.

Track listing
All tracks were produced by Madlib.

References

2014 EPs
Freddie Gibbs albums
Madlib albums
Albums produced by Madlib